Duke Jian may refer to:

Duke Jian of Qi (died 481 BC)
Duke Jian of Qin (428–400 BC)